Trevis may refer to:

People

Surname
Bos Trevis (1911–1984), English footballer
Derek Trevis (1942–2000), English footballer
Di Trevis (born 1947), English theatre director and actress
Floyd Trevis, American racing car constructor of the 1950s and 1960s

Given name
Trevis Gipson (born 1997), American football linebacker
Trevis Jackson (born 1995), Filipino-American basketball player
Trevis Smith (born 1976), Canadian football linebacker
Trevis Simpson (born 1991), American basketball player
Trevis Turner (born 1987), American football offensive lineman

Other uses
Trevis., taxonomic author abbreviation of Vittore Benedetto Antonio Trevisan de Saint-Léon (1818–1897), Italian botanist
A device used in shoeing oxen, see Livestock crush#History
Treviso Bresciano (Brescian: Trevìs), comune in the province of Brescia, in Lombardy
Daihatsu Trevis, export name of the Daihatsu Mira Gino in some markets in Europe

See also
Trevi (disambiguation)
Travis (disambiguation)